The 1887 Pittsburgh Alleghenys season was the sixth season of the Pittsburgh Alleghenys franchise and its first in the National League, where they remain to this day. The Alleghenys finished sixth in the standings with a record of 55–69.

Regular season

Season standings

Record vs. opponents

Opening Day lineup

Roster

Player stats

Batting

Starters by position 
Note: Pos = Position; G = Games played; AB = At bats; H = Hits; Avg. = Batting average; HR = Home runs; RBI = Runs batted in

Other batters 
Note: G = Games played; AB = At bats; H = Hits; Avg. = Batting average; HR = Home runs; RBI = Runs batted in

Pitching

Starting pitchers 
Note: G = Games pitched; IP = Innings pitched; W = Wins; L = Losses; ERA = Earned run average; SO = Strikeouts

Relief pitchers 
Note: G = Games pitched; W = Wins; L = Losses; SV = Saves; ERA = Earned run average; SO = Strikeouts

References 
 1887 Pittsburgh Alleghenys team page at Baseball Reference
 1887 Pittsburgh Alleghenys Page at Baseball Almanac

Pittsburgh Pirates seasons
Pittsburgh Alleghenys season
Pittsburg Pir